Two ships of the Royal Navy have borne the name HMS Rhododendron, after the flower:

  was an  sloop launched in 1917 and sunk in 1918.
  was a  launched in 1940 and sold in 1947 for mercantile service as Maj Vinke.

Royal Navy ship names